Idol Drama Operation Team was a 2017 South Korean web variety program. The program was presented through Naver TVCast and Naver V App every Monday, Wednesday, and Friday at 11:00 (KST), starting from May 29, 2017. Starting June 10, it was then aired on KBS Joy (KBS N) and KBS World. The show invited seven girl group members to create their very own Korean drama series by becoming accredited scriptwriters as well as acting in the series as fictional versions of themselves.

The drama they had worked on was named Let's Only Walk The Flower Road, an autobiographical drama. The first episode of the drama debuted on June 26, at 11:00 (KST) through Naver TVCast and Naver V App. It aired daily for 8 episodes until July 3, 2017.

On July 4, each member's full performances for The Five was revealed, as unrevealed scenes of the drama. Girls Next Door, the group produced through the show, then made their official debut on Music Bank on July 14.

Cast

Members of Girls Next Door
 Moonbyul as Moon Byul-yi, also the leader of the group
 Seulgi as Kang Seul-gi
 Kim So-hee as Kim So-hee
 D.ana as Jo Eun-ae
 YooA as Yoo Shi-ah
 Ryu Su-jeong as Ryu Su-jeong
 Jeon Somi as Jeon So-mi

Guest appearances for Let's Only Walk The Flower Road
 Jang Won-young as IM Entertainment's Director Jang, and judge of The Five (Episodes 1-8)
Also the acting coach of the 7 girl group members before filming of the drama
 Jeon So-min as Jeon So-min, a 1st generation idol, senior of Girls Next Door (Episodes 1, 8)
 Shin Hyun-joon as the PD of Music Bank (Episodes 1, 7)
 Baek A-yeon as Baek A-yeon, the other 1st place nominee on Music Bank (Episodes 1, 8)
 Snuper as performers on Music Bank (Episodes 1, 8)
 Sonamoo as performers on Music Bank (Episodes 1, 8)
 MASC as performers on Music Bank (Episodes 1, 8)
 Victon as performers on Music Bank (Episodes 1, 8)
 Momoland as performers on Music Bank (Episodes 1, 8)
 Kim Jong-min as jokbal delivery man (Episode 2)
 Im Won-hee as IM Entertainment's CEO Im, and judge of The Five (Episodes 2-8)
 Kwon Oh-joong as friend of Director Jang (Episode 2)
 Bae Yoon-jung as the dance teacher for Girls Next Door, and judge of The Five (Episodes 3, 4, 8)
 Jun Hyun-moo as the MC of The Five (Episode 4)
 Gaeko as rap teacher for Moon Byul-yi (Episode 5)
 Choiza as rap teacher for Moon Byul-yi (Episode 5)
 Chungha as Kim Chung-ha, artist of another company (Episodes 5, 6)
 Kim Geun-soo as the CEO of Chung-ha's company (Episode 5)
 Sung Byung-sook as So-hee's grandmother (Episode 5)
 Jinyoung as Girls Next Door's senior, former IM Entertainment trainee (Episodes 6, 7)
Also the songwriter/producer for Deep Blue Eyes
 Woo Hye-rim as the recorder of the viral Girls Next Door fancam (Episode 8)
 Kangnam as the MC of Music Bank (Episode 8)
 Nahyun as the MC of Music Bank (Episode 8)

Episodes

Idol Drama Operation Team

Let's Only Walk The Flower Road 
The episode title is based on each girl's original group popular title track (except Sonamoo).

Original Soundtrack

OST Part 1

OST Part 2

OST Part 3

OST Part 4

Charted songs

Awards and nominations

Melon Music Awards 

|-
| 2017
| Girls Next Door - Deep Blue Eyes
| Hot Trend Award
| 
|-

References

South Korean reality television series